It's in the Blood is a 1938 British comedy film directed by Gene Gerrard and starring Claude Hulbert, Lesley Brook and Max Leeds. It was made at Teddington Studios by the British subsidiary of Warner Brothers.

Cast
 Claude Hulbert as Edwin Povey  
 Lesley Brook as Jill Borden  
 Max Leeds as James Renton  
 James Stephenson as Milky Joe  
 Clem Lawrence as Dave Grimmett  
 Glen Alyn as Celestin  
 Percy Walsh as Jules Barres 
 George Galleon as Gendarme

References

Bibliography
 Low, Rachael. Filmmaking in 1930s Britain. George Allen & Unwin, 1985.
 Wood, Linda. British Films, 1927-1939. British Film Institute, 1986.

External links

1938 films
British comedy films
1938 comedy films
Films shot at Teddington Studios
Films directed by Gene Gerrard
Warner Bros. films
British black-and-white films
1930s English-language films
1930s British films